Kim Kang Hyun (born May 16, 1985 in South Korea) is a South Korean footballer who currently plays as a midfielder for Persiwa Wamena.

External links
 Profile at Goal.com
 
 Profile at Liga Indonesia Official Site
 

Living people
1985 births
South Korean footballers
Pohang Steelers players
Expatriate footballers in Indonesia
Liga 1 (Indonesia) players
Persibo Bojonegoro players
Persiwa Wamena players
Association football midfielders